The discography of Yasiin Bey / Mos Def, an American rapper, consists of four solo albums, two compilation albums, and several singles. Mos Def began his hip hop career in 1994 in the underground rap group UTD (Urban Thermo Dynamics) alongside his sibling group members DCQ and Ces, after which he pursued a solo career. In 1998, he made his mainstream debut on Rawkus Records in the duo Black Star with rapper Talib Kweli. "Definition", the lead single from Black Star's self-titled debut album, reached No. 60 on the Billboard Hot 100 and No. 3 on the Hot Rap Singles chart.

In 1999, Mos Def released his solo debut album Black on Both Sides, which was certified Gold in the US and featured the singles "Ms. Fat Booty", which reached No. 20 on the US Billboard Hot Rap Singles chart, and "Umi Says", which reached No. 60 on the UK Singles Chart. Mos Def performed on several compilations from Rawkus Records and other independent compilation albums. Among them was the single "Oh No" with Pharaohe Monch and Nate Dogg which reached No. 83 on the Hot 100 and No. 1 on the Hot Rap Singles. In 2001, his single "Jam on It" from Underground Airplay Version 1.0 reached No. 23 on the Hot Rap Tracks. In 2002, he appeared on the track "Brown Sugar (Extra Sweet)" on the soundtrack to the film Brown Sugar. Featuring Faith Evans, "Brown Sugar (Extra Sweet)" reached No. 95 on the Hot R&B/Hip-Hop Songs chart.

In 2004, Mos Def released his second solo album The New Danger, in which he experimented with other genres such as rock and R&B. The single "Sex, Love & Money" reached No. 90 on the R&B chart. Later the same year saw the release of UTD album Manifest Destiny under the independent label Illsion Media, run by Mos Def's brother and fellow group member DCQ. The album featured a compilation of previously unreleased and re-released tracks recorded during the original UTD run. Mos Def's third solo album, Tru3 Magic, was released in 2006 to very little hype. Its single "Undeniable" charted only on the Hot R&B/Hip-Hop Singles Sales chart but was nominated for the Grammy Award for Best Rap Performance in 2007.

Mos Def's fourth solo album The Ecstatic was released in 2009 on Downtown Records with distribution by Universal Records. His fifth album Negus was exclusively premiered during Art Basel in Hong Kong on March 29, 2019; and according to a press release, it will never receive a physical or digital release but will be displayed at sound installations around the world.

Albums

Studio albums 
{| class="wikitable plainrowheaders" style="text-align:center;"
|+ List of albums, with selected chart positions and certifications
! scope="col" rowspan="2" style="width:11em;" | Title
! scope="col" rowspan="2" style="width:16em;" | Details
! scope="col" colspan="8" | Peak chart positions
! scope="col" rowspan="2" style="width:12em;"| Sales
! scope="col" rowspan="2" style="width:12em;" | Certifications
|-
!style="width:3em;font-size:90%;"|US
!style="width:3em;font-size:90%;"|USR&B
!style="width:3em;font-size:90%;"|USRap
!style="width:3em;font-size:90%;"|AUS
!style="width:3em;font-size:90%;"|CAN
!style="width:3em;font-size:90%;"|FRA
!style="width:3em;font-size:90%;"|SWI
!style="width:3em;font-size:90%;"|UK
|-
!scope="row"|Black on Both Sides
|
 Released: October 12, 1999
 Label: Rawkus, Universal
 Format: CD, LP, cassette, digital download
| 25 || 3 || — || — || — || — || — || 110
|
US: 913,000
|
 RIAA: Gold
 BPI: Silver
|-
!scope="row"|The New Danger
|
 Released: October 12, 2004
 Label: Rawkus, Geffen
 Format: CD, LP, digital download
| 5 || 2 || 1 || — || — || 103 || 50 || 56
|
US: 513,000
|
 RIAA: Gold
|-
!scope="row"|True Magic
|
 Released: December 29, 2006
 Label: Geffen
 Format: CD
| 77 || 25 || 12 || — || — || — || — || —
|
US: 97,000
|
|-
!scope="row"|The Ecstatic
|
 Released: June 9, 2009
 Label: Downtown
 Format: CD, LP, digital download
| 9 || 5 || 2 || 91 || 24 || 172 || 90 || 167
|
US: 168,000
|
|-
!scope="row"|Negus|
 Released: November 15, 2019
 Label: self-released
 Format: Sound installation
| — || — || — || — || — || — || — || —
|

|
|-
|colspan="14" style="font-size:90%"| "—" denotes a recording that did not chart or was not released in that territory.
|}

Collaborative albums

Compilation albums

Singles
Solo

A.  Charted only on the Bubbling Under R&B/Hip-Hop Singles chart, a 25-song extensions of the original Hot R&B/Hip-Hop Songs chart.
B.  Charted only on the Hot Singles Sales or Hot R&B/Hip-Hop Singles Sales charts.

Collaborative singles

A.  Charted only on the Hot Singles Sales or Hot R&B/Hip-Hop Singles Sales charts.

As featured artist

A.  Charted only on the Hot Singles Sales or Hot R&B/Hip-Hop Singles Sales charts.

Other appearances

Videos
 1994: Manifest Destiny (Urban Thermo Dynamics)
 1996: The Love Song (Da Bush Babees featuring Mos Def)
 1998: Travellin' Man (DJ Honda featuring Mos Def)
 1998: Body Rock (Mos Def, Q-Tip & Tash)
 1998: Definition (Black Star)
 1999: Respiration (Black Star featuring Common)
 1999: Tinseltown To The Boogiedown (Scritti Politti featuring Mos Def & Lee Majors)
 1999: B-Boy Document '99 (The High & Mighty featuring Mos Def & Skillz)
 1999: Ms. Fat Booty (Mos Def)
 1999: Umi Says (Mos Def)
 2000: One Four Love (Part 1) (Common, Kool G Rap, Posdnuos, Rah Digga, Sporty Thievz, Black Star, Pharaohe Monch & Shabaam Sahdeeq)
 2000: Blak Iz Blak (Mos Def, Canibus, Charli Baltimore, MC Serch, Mums, DJ Scratch & Gano Grills)
 2000: Oh No (Mos Def, Pharoahe Monch & Nate Dogg)
 2002: Brown Sugar (Extra Sweet) (Mos Def featuring Faith Evans)
 2004: Two Words (Kanye West featuring Mos Def, Freeway & The Harlem Boys Choir)
 2004: Ghetto Rock (Mos Def)
 2004: Sex, Love & Money (Mos Def)
 2005: Yo-Yo-Yo (Medina Green featuring Mos Def)
 2005: Dollar Day (Mos Def)
 2009: Casa Bey (Mos Def)
 2009: Ain't Nothing Like You (Hoochie Coo) (The Black Keys featuring Mos Def & Jim Jones)
 2009: Taxi (Snippet) (Ski featuring Mos Def)
 2009: Supermagic (Mos Def)
 2010: History (Mos Def featuring Talib Kweli)
 2010: White Drapes (Snippet) (Mos Def)
 2010: Stylo (Gorillaz featuring Mos Def & Bobby Womack)
 2010: It Ain't My Fault (Gulf Aid All-Stars featuring Preservation Hall Jazz Band, Mos Def, Lenny Kravitz & Trombone Shorty)
 2010: Cream of the Planet (Ski Beatz featuring Mos Def)
 2016: Rude Boy Remix'' (Angel featuring JME, Wretch 32, Tally)

See also
Black Star discography

References

Notes

Hip hop discographies
 
Discographies of American artists